Marcantonio Bragadin (6 October 1906, Rome – 11 June 1986, Rome) was an Italian admiral of the Royal Italian Navy and the Italian Navy. He was also an essayist and the screenwriter of a number of war films. He was a direct descendant of the 16th-century Venetian commander Marco Antonio Bragadin.

Life
During World War II, Bragadin served as staff officer at Supermarina, the command of the Royal Italian Navy. After the war he became a naval historian; besides dealing with specialist topics, in 1949 he wrote the educational work Che ha fatto la Marina? 1940–45 (What did the Navy do? 1940–45) to make the navy's actions during World War II better known – they were then little known due to censorship. He had planned it in 1942 whilst serving in the Supermarina.

He was also the advisor, screenwriter, production manager, consultant and assistant director on four 1950s Italian war films – three directed by Duilio Coletti (I sette dell'Orsa maggiore, Divisione Folgore and La grande speranza) and one by Antonio Leonviola (Siluri umani, 1954)

Works
 La marina italiana nella seconda guerra mondiale (1940–43), 1950, Lega Navale S.d.
 La marina italiana 1940–1945 - Segreti bellici e scelte operative, Bologna, Odoya, 2011,  pagg. 435
 Storia delle repubbliche marinare, Odoya, Bologna, pagg. 320, 
 Che ha fatto la Marina? 1940–45, Milano, Garzanti, 1949, prima edizione, pp. 611, con illustrazioni, foto in b/n, cartine e schede
 Il dramma della marina italiana 1940–1945. Milano: Oscar Mondadori, 1982
 SIM, SIS e SIA – Operazione Rigoletto – Da Roma a Mosca. - “Storia Illustrata”, numero speciale – Lo spionaggio nella Seconda Guerra Mondiale – vol. XXIII, n. 144, Novembre 1969, pp. 28–38;

References

External links
http://www.raistoria.rai.it/articoli/la-battaglia-dellatlantico-la-marina-da-guerra-italiana-seconda-guerra-mondiale/3785/default.aspx
Marcantonio Bragadin on IMDB

1906 births
1986 deaths
Regia Marina personnel of World War II
Italian military historians
20th-century Italian screenwriters
Military personnel from Rome
Italian essayists
Male essayists
Italian male screenwriters
20th-century essayists
Italian male non-fiction writers
Writers from Rome
20th-century Italian male writers
Bragadin family